Garibaldi is a locality in the Western District of the Australian state of Victoria. Garibaldi is a small Victorian Rural Location within the local government area of Golden Plains, it is located approximately 97kms from the capital Melbourne covering an area of 11.75 square kilometres. Garibaldi has a recorded population of 123 residents and is within the Australian Eastern Daylight Time zone Australia/Melbourne.

References

Towns in Victoria (Australia)
Golden Plains Shire